Jimmy Cooper may refer to:
Jimmy Cooper (musician) (1907–1977), Scottish hammered dulcimer player
Jimmy Cooper (footballer) (born 1939), Scottish football winger
Jimmy Cooper (boxer), American featherweight boxer from the 1940s and 1950s
Jimmy Cooper, lead character from the film Quadrophenia
Jimmy Cooper (The O.C.), fictional TV character from The O.C.

See also
Jim Cooper (disambiguation)
James Cooper (disambiguation)